The Louvre Pyramid (Pyramide du Louvre) is a large glass and metal structure designed by the Chinese-American architect I. M. Pei. The pyramid is in the main courtyard (Cour Napoléon) of the Louvre Palace in Paris, surrounded by three smaller pyramids. The large pyramid serves as the main entrance to the Louvre Museum. Completed in 1988 as part of the broader Grand Louvre project, it has become a landmark of the city of Paris.

Design and construction 

The Grand Louvre project was announced in 1981 by François Mitterrand, then President of France. In 1983 the Chinese-American architect I. M. Pei was selected as its architect. The pyramid structure was initially designed by Pei in late 1983 and presented to the public in early 1984. It consists of 603 rhombus-shaped and 70 triangular glass segments.

The pyramid structure was engineered by Nicolet Chartrand Knoll Ltd. of Montreal (Pyramid Structure / Design Consultant) and Rice Francis Ritchie of Paris (Pyramid Structure / Construction Phase).

The pyramid and the underground lobby beneath it were created because of deficiencies with the Louvre's earlier layout, which could no longer handle the increasing number of visitors on an everyday basis. Visitors entering through the pyramid descend into the spacious lobby then ascend into the main Louvre buildings.

For design historian Mark Pimlott, "I.M. Pei’s plan distributes people effectively from the central concourse to myriad destinations within its vast subterranean network... the architectonic framework evokes, at gigantic scale, an ancient atrium of a Pompeiian villa; the treatment of the opening above, with its tracery of engineered castings and cables, evokes the atria of corporate office buildings; the busy movement of people from all directions suggests the concourses of rail termini or international airports."

Several other museums and commercial centers have emulated this concept, most notably the Museum of Science and Industry in Chicago and Pioneer Place in Portland, designed by Kathie Stone Milano with ELS/Elbasani and Logan, Architects from Berkeley, California. The Dolphin Centre, featuring a similar pyramid, was opened in April 1982, by Prince Richard, Duke of Gloucester. The construction work on the pyramid base and underground lobby was carried out by the Vinci construction company.

Aesthetic and political debate over its design

The construction of the pyramid triggered many years of lively aesthetic and political debate.  Criticisms tended to fall into four areas:

 The modernist style of the edifice being inconsistent with the classic French Renaissance style and history of the Louvre
 The pyramid being an unsuitable symbol of death from ancient Egypt
 The project being megalomaniacal folly imposed by then-President François Mitterrand
 Chinese-American architect I.M. Pei being insufficiently familiar with the culture of France to be entrusted with the task of updating the treasured Parisian landmark.

Those criticizing the aesthetics said it was "sacrilegious" to tamper with the Louvre's majestic old French Renaissance architecture, and called the pyramid an anachronistic intrusion of an Egyptian death symbol in the middle of Paris. Meanwhile, political critics referred to the structure as Pharaoh François' Pyramid. Writing in The Nation, Alexander Cockburn ridiculed Pei's rationale that the structure would help visitors locate the entrance: "What Pei really meant was that in our unfolding fin de siècle, public institutions need an area (...) where rich people can assemble for cocktail parties, banquets and kindred functions, to which the word 'charity' is attached to satisfy bodies such as the IRS." Some still feel the modernism of the edifice is out of place.

Number of panes
The pyramid has a total of 673 panes, as confirmed by the Louvre, 603 rhombi and 70 triangles. Three sides have 171 panes each: 18 triangular ones on the edges and 153 rhombic ones arranged in a triangle; the fourth side, with the entrance, has 9 fewer rhombic and 2 fewer triangular ones, giving 160. Some commentators report that Pei's office counts 689.

However, a longstanding rumor claims that the pyramid includes exactly 666 panes, "the number of the beast", often associated with Satan. The story of the 666 panes originated in the 1980s, when the official brochure published during construction cited this number twice. The number 666 was also mentioned in various newspapers. One writer on esoteric architecture asserted that "the pyramid is dedicated to a power described as the Beast in the Book of Revelation.... The entire structure is based on the number 6."

The myth resurfaced in 2003, with the protagonist of the best-selling novel The Da Vinci Code saying: "this pyramid, at President Mitterrand's explicit demand, had been constructed of exactly 666 panes of glass — a bizarre request that had always been a hot topic among conspiracy buffs who claimed 666 was the number of Satan." In fact, according to Pei's office, Mitterrand never specified the number of panes.

Inverted Pyramid

The Inverted Pyramid (Pyramide Inversée) is a skylight in the Carrousel du Louvre shopping mall in front of the Louvre Museum. It looks like an upside-down and smaller version of the Louvre Pyramid.

Renovation
Designed for a museum that attracted 4.5 million visitors a year, the pyramid proved inadequate by the time the Louvre's attendance had doubled in 2014. Between 2014 and 2017, the layout of the foyer area in the Cour Napoleon beneath the glass pyramid underwent a thorough redesign, including better access to the pyramid and the Passage Richelieu.

Pei's other glass pyramids
Prior to designing the Louvre Pyramid, Pei had included smaller glass pyramids in his design for the National Gallery of Art's East Building in Washington, D.C., completed in 1978. Multiple small glass pyramids, along with a fountain, were built in the plaza between the East Building and the pre-existing West Building, acting as a unifying element between the two properties and serving as skylights for the underground atrium that connected the buildings. The same year the Louvre Pyramid opened, Pei included large glass pyramids on the roofs of the IBM Somers Office Complex he designed in Westchester County, New York. Pei returned again to the glass pyramid concept at the Rock and Roll Hall of Fame in Cleveland, Ohio, opened in 1995.

Precursor at the Louvre
In 1839, according to one newspaper account, in ceremonies commemorating the "glorious revolution" of 1830, "The tombs of the Louvre were covered with black hangings and adorned with tricolored flags. In front and in the middle was erected an expiatory monument of a pyramidal shape, and surmounted by a funeral vase."

According to the memoirs of the Duke of Sully, a 20 foot high pyramid, which stood opposite the Louvre with only a street between them, was torn down in 1605 because the Jesuits objected to an inscription on a pillar.

See also

Yann Weymouth

References

External links

Great buildings
Louvre

Buildings and structures completed in 1989
Buildings and structures in Paris
Louvre Palace
Art gallery districts
I. M. Pei buildings
Urban legends
Lattice shell structures
Pyramids in France
1989 establishments in France
Architectural controversies
20th-century architecture in France